"Cain Rose Up" is a horror short story by American writer Stephen King. It was originally published in the Spring 1968 issue of Ubris magazine, and collected in King's Skeleton Crew in 1985. It deals with a depressed and homicidal college student, Curt Garrish, who goes on a murderous sniper rampage from his dormitory room.

Plot summary
Curt Garrish is a college student who lives in one of the campus dorms. At the end of a spring semester, he returns to his room after a particularly hard exam. He talks to a couple of his fellow students and the dorm's RA who tells him to fill out a damage form. Garrish's roommate, an untidy student nicknamed Piggy, has already left for the semester. Garrish takes out a hunting rifle hidden in his closet. Rifles are permitted on campus, with proper documentation, for use on the campus' shooting range. Garrish had checked the rifle out and hidden it in the woods, retrieving it late at night while everyone was asleep. He field strips and loads it from a box of ammunition. After talking to another student named Bailey, who takes the nude model pinups from over Piggy's bed, Garrish relates the story of Cain and Abel, then opens a window and begins to hunt for targets outside. His first shot kills a pretty blonde student. His next shots take out her parents, then other students as they try to run. Garrish sees another student trying to hide and wanting to run but is frozen with fear. Garrish begins to pull the trigger again.

Film adaptation
The story was adapted into a short film in 2013. It was directed by Ranjeet S. Marwa.

The short story was adapted once again in 2022 by Miguel Alejandro Marquez, with actor Steven Braunstein starring as Curt.

See also
 Stephen King short fiction bibliography
 Rage (King novel)
 University of Texas tower shooting
 School shooting

References

1982 short stories
Horror short stories
Short stories by Stephen King
Works about school violence
Works originally published in Ubris